Bosna may refer to:

Places
 Bosna, Edirne
 Bosna (Kakanj), a village in Kakanj, Bosnia and Herzegovina
 Bosna, Kansas, United States
 Bosna-Serai or Sarajevo, Bosnia and Herzegovina
 Bosna village, Bulgaria
 Bosnia (early medieval)
 Bosnia (region), 
 Bosnia and Herzegovina, a country in southern Europe

Geographical features
 Bosna (ridge), a mountain ridge in Bulgaria
 Bosna (river), a river in the republic of Bosnia and Herzegovina

Other uses
 Air Bosna or B&H Airlines, out of Sarajevo, Bosnia and Herzegovina
 Bosna (sausage),  a spicy Austrian fast food dish
 Special Police Squad "Bosna", a special forces unit in Bosnia and Herzegovina
 USD Bosna, a Bosnian Sport organization and multisport club, including a list of teams

See also
 Bosnäs, Borås Municipality, Västra Götaland County, Sweden
Bosnia (disambiguation)